Jimmy Carter, a Democrat from Georgia, was elected President of the United States on November 2, 1976 and was inaugurated as the nation's 39th president on January 20, 1977, and his presidency ended on January 20, 1981 with the inauguration of Ronald Reagan. The following articles cover the timeline of the Carter's presidency:

 Pre-presidency: 1974–1977
Jimmy Carter 1976 presidential campaign
Presidential transition of Jimmy Carter
 Presidency: 1977–1981
Timeline of the Jimmy Carter presidency (1977)
Timeline of the Jimmy Carter presidency (1978)
Timeline of the Jimmy Carter presidency (1979)
Timeline of the Jimmy Carter presidency (1980–January 1981)

See also
 Timeline of the Gerald Ford presidency, for his predecessor
 Timeline of the Ronald Reagan presidency, for his successor

Carter, Jimmy
Presidency of Jimmy Carter